Argyresthia undulatella is a moth of the  family Yponomeutidae. It is found in North America, including Kentucky and Ohio.

The wingspan is about 9 mm. The forewings are white, with the base of the costal edge brownish and with the costal and apical parts rather freely dusted with brown scales. The hindwings are light fuscous.

The larvae feed on Ulmus species, including Ulmus fulva and Ulmus rubra.

References

Moths described in 1874
Argyresthia
Moths of North America